Transcription software assists in the conversion of human speech into a text transcript. Audio or video files can be transcribed manually or automatically. Transcriptionists can replay a recording several times in a transcription editor and type what they hear. By using transcription hot keys, the manual transcription can be accelerated, the sound filtered, equalized or have the tempo adjusted when the clarity is not great. With speech recognition technology, transcriptionists can automatically convert recordings to text transcripts by opening recordings in a PC and uploading them to a cloud for automatic transcription, or transcribe recordings in real-time by using digital dictation. Depending on quality of recordings, machine generated transcripts may still need to be manually verified. The accuracy rate of the automatic transcription depends on several factors such as background noises, speakers' distance to the microphone, and accents. 

Transcription software, as with transcription services, is often provided for business, legal, or medical purposes. Compared with audio content, a text transcript is searchable, takes up less computer memory, and can be used as an alternate method of communication, such as for closed captions.

The definition of transcription "software", as compared with transcription "service", is that the former is sufficiently automated that a user can run the entire system without engaging outside personnel. However, the advent of software-as-a-service and cloud computing models blur this distinction. It uses artificial intelligence, machine learning and natural language processing to convert speech to text and continuously learn new phrases and accents.

Development 
Research at Google released a free android app Google Live Transcribe, it runs on Google Cloud. Google Chrome developed  and has a available built in English Live Caption. Google Docs, Google Translate, Google Assistant, GBoard Google Text to Speech engine support transcription tool too.

See also
 Digital dictation
 Optical character recognition
 Speech synthesis

References

Speech recognition